FBI Deputy Director Avery Ryan, Ph.D. is a fictional character portrayed by Patricia Arquette. She was a psychologist in New York until she was hacked and one of her patients was murdered because of it. Avery made her first appearance during the backdoor pilot of CSI: Cyber which was entitled "Kitty". Avery is notable within the series for taking chances on former hackers (known as black hats) and for the fact that she herself has been hacked. Avery has appeared in 2 episodes of CSI: Crime Scene Investigation, and every episode of CSI: Cyber.

Opening narration 
Avery narrates the opening of CSI: Cyber season one.
 "My name is Avery Ryan. I was a victim of cyber crime. Like you, I posted on social media, checked my bank account online and even kept confidential files of my psychological practice on my computer. Then I was hacked. And as a result one of my patients was murdered. My investigation into her death led me to the FBI where I joined a team of criminal experts who wage a war against a new breed of criminal hiding on the deep web. Infiltrating our daily lives in ways we never imagined. Faceless, nameless, lurking inside our devices. Just a keystroke away.... it can happen to you..."
Avery also narrates the opening of CSI: Cyber second season premiere episode.
 "My name is Avery Ryan. I'm a cyber psychologist and special agent for the FBI. I lead a team of cyber experts and former blackhats, waging a war against a new breed of criminal. Online predators hiding in the deep web. Faceless, nameless. Hackers intruding into our digital lives. Lurking inside our devices, just a keystroke away."

Creation
Patricia Arquette's casting was announced on 6 March 2014. The character is based on Irish cyber psychologist Mary Aiken.

Background
Avery Ryan worked as a psychologist to 78 patients in New York when her practice database was hacked and a patient was murdered. After the FBI failed to catch the person responsible, she volunteered herself to head a division dedicated to solving Cyber Crime. Avery also had a daughter named Hannah, who died, and an ex-husband, whom she divorced as a result of the death.

Storylines

CSI: Crime Scene Investigation 
 Seasons 14–15
Avery is introduced during "Kitty", in which she travels to Las Vegas to assist D.B. Russell and his team in the hunt for a cyber criminal manipulating powerful men into communicating with a "node", before blackmailing and threatening them. During the investigation, Ryan develops a strong working relationship with Russell, resulting in her consulting on the Gig Harbor case later that same year ("The Twin Paradox").

CSI: Cyber 
 Season 1
Avery Ryan heads a team of Special Agents and former black hat hackers who are recruited as part of her 'Hack for Good' program. In "Kidnapping 2.0", Ryan heads an investigation into a series of hacked baby monitors and the kidnapping of a child. Avery believes it may only be part of a wider conspiracy, and as such follows the case nationwide, eventually rescuing the kidnap victim. In "Killer En Route", when investigating murders using a taxi service app, Avery once again empathizes with the murderer when she had learned that he lost his child, while in "URL Interrupted", she helps one of her former patients when his daughter runs away due to being cyberbullied. It is later revealed that Avery becomes personally involved in cases involving children due to the death of her daughter ("Family Secrets"). During "Family Secrets", Avery finally meets and confronts the person who hacked her practice, it is revealed that the hacker has subsequently continued to stalk Ryan, and he takes her hostage. As her team try to track her down, it is revealed that she has an ex-husband, and their marriage broke up due to the death of her daughter.

 Season 2
Following the departure of Simon Sifter, Avery gains autonomy over Cyber's budget and hires D.B. Russell, with whom she worked in Las Vegas. The two continue to have a strong working relationship, racing cockroaches and flying drones ("Why-Fi"). Ryan considers taking over Sifter's vacant position, but decides she is needed on the street. She and Russell are later caught in the crossfire when a small town erupts in racial tension ("Brown Eyes, Blue Eyes"). Ryan notes that since rejecting the Deputy Directorship, she is looked upon more unfavorably by senior FBI officials ("Red Crone"). In "Red Crone", when she and D.B. find out about Raven and Brody's secret relationship, she notes that while she values the rules she sets for her black-hats, she is also willing to overlook transgressions in order to facilitate their happiness. In "Gone in 6 Seconds", the FBI Director tells Avery that he believes she is the best candidate for the job of Deputy Director, and expresses his faith in her heading Cyber while still working the field. She is subsequently promoted.

Succession

References

CSI: Cyber characters
Fictional characters from New York City
Television characters introduced in 2014
Fictional Federal Bureau of Investigation personnel
Fictional psychologists
Crossover characters in television